Adam Zaruba (born March 31, 1991) is a Canadian American football tight end who is currently a free agent. He is also a rugby sevens player for the Canada national rugby sevens team.  His CFL rights belong to the Saskatchewan Roughriders.

Professional career
Zaruba signed a three-year contract with the Philadelphia Eagles as an undrafted free agent on July 24, 2017. He was waived on September 1, 2017. He signed a reserve/future contract with the Eagles on January 3, 2018.

On August 5, 2018, Zaruba was waived/injured by the Eagles and was placed on injured reserve. He was released on August 11, 2018.

References

External links 
 
 Adam Zaruba at the 2019 Pan American Games

1991 births
Living people
Canadian players of American football
Canada international rugby sevens players
Philadelphia Eagles players
American football tight ends
Simon Fraser Clan football players
Rugby union players that played in the NFL
Pan American Games medalists in rugby sevens
Pan American Games silver medalists for Canada
Rugby sevens players at the 2019 Pan American Games
Medalists at the 2019 Pan American Games